A table tennis racket (also known as a "paddle" or "bat") is used by table tennis players. It is usually made from laminated wood covered with rubber on one or two sides depending on the player's grip. Unlike a conventional "racket", it does not include strings strung across an open frame. Though the official ITTF term is "racket", the US generally uses the term "paddle", while Europe and Asia use the term "bat".

Rubber variations 

Table tennis regulations approved by the International Table Tennis Federation (ITTF) allow different surfaces on each side of the paddle for varying amount
of spin (including nullifying it) or speed. For example, a player may have a spin-heavy rubber on one side of his paddle, and no spin on the other side. The player can flip the racket during play for different types of returns. To help a player distinguish between different types of rubber used by his opponent, regulations specify that one side of a paddle must be red, blue, violet, pink, or green while the other must be black, allowing a player to see what side of a paddle hits the ball mid-play. The player has the right to inspect his opponent's racket before a match to see the type and color. Current rules state that, unless damaged in play, the paddle cannot be exchanged for another at any time during a match.

The rubber coating may be of pimpled rubber, with the pimples outward, or it may be composed of a sponge layer, covered by rubber that may have the pimples pointed inwards or outwards. Some paddles are not covered with rubber ("naked") to make them spin-resistant. However, these are not approved for competition play by the ITTF. Some types of rubbers are also not approved. Approved rubbers have the ITTF emblem on the base of the rubber.

Assembly 
Players have many options and variations in rubber sheets on their racket. Although a racket may be purchased assembled with rubber by the manufacturer, most serious tournament players will use a custom racket. A player selects a blank blade (i.e., a racket without rubber) based on his or her playing style. The type of wood or synthetic layers used to make up the blade will determine the blade's speed. The different types of rubber sheets affect the level of spin, speed, and other specific playing characteristics. Racket construction and new rubber technology contribute significantly to the amount of deviation from the expected ball flight path.

Glues and gluing
Normally, a sheet of rubber is glued to a blade using table tennis brand glues such as STIGA, Butterfly, Donic, or DHS. Some glues may work even if they are not designed specifically for table tennis rackets, such as rubber cement and tear mender.. The rubber is not removed until it wears out or becomes damaged. In the 1980s, some players developed a new technique with a special glue called speed glue to apply the rubber every time they played. The glue would help provide more spin and speed by providing a "catapult" effect. Speed glue and all other compounds containing high VOC content were allowed for the last time in the 2008 Summer Olympics and are currently disallowed by ITTF regulations.

Maintenance and protection 
The surface of a racket will develop a smooth glossy patina with use. The rubber surface needs regular cleaning to retain a high friction surface for ball spin. Commercial cleaners or water and soap can be cleaning agents.

2021 bat colour rule change 
Prior to 2021, the laws of table tennis specified that one side of the bat must be red and the other black. However, in 2021 the rules were officially amended so that blue, green, purple, and pink bats could be used as well as red ones. Nevertheless, one side must still remain black.

References

Table tennis
Sports equipment